Gizem Başaran (born 28 September 1992) is a Turkish basketball player. The  national plays Center.

Career
On 20 May 2021, she signed a one-year contract with Galatasaray.

References

External links
 Gizem Başaran Turan at Tbf.org
 Gizem Başaran at Galatasaray.org

1992 births
Living people
Galatasaray S.K. (women's basketball) players
Hatay Büyükşehir Belediyesi (women's basketball) players
Basketball players from Istanbul
Turkish women's basketball players
Beşiktaş women's basketball players
Centers (basketball)
Mersin Büyükşehir Belediyesi women's basketball players